is a former Japanese pop singer and songwriter from Nishinomiya, Hyogo. She was signed to Giza Studio and Tent House after she came in second place on fifth season of Super Starlight Contest, the audition hosted by Being. Her debut extended play The Note of My Eighteen Years was released in 2003, and her debut studio album My Favorite Things was released on September 5, 2004. In August 2005, Takei released the single "Sekai Tomete", which served as the ending theme song for the Japanese animated television series, Case Closed. The song reached number 27 in Japan and became her best-selling single in her career.

In February 2008, Takei released her first compilation album Shiori Takei Best to a moderate commercial success, reaching number 69 in Japan. She reportedly retired from the music industry in 2009 and her name was removed from the artist list of her former label.

Biography
After graduating from high school, she began her music activities, such as performing in live concerts, in the Kansai area. Through her work in the independent music scene, she released a cover album with the support of the members of the fusion band Dimension.

In 2003, she participated in cover album "The Hit Parade" where Tak Matsumoto from B'z was executive producer.

In February 2004, she made her major debut with the single "Shizukanaru Melody". In 2005, she released her 5th single Sekai Tomete which was used as ending theme for TV anime series Detective Conan. With more than 13,000 copies sold, this single became the biggest hit of her whole career.

In 2006, she began to broadcast her own radio program "Takei Shiori no Onsen Biyori" (竹井詩織里の音泉日和). The regular broadcast ended in 2008.

Takei sang backing vocals for many other artists such as Zard, Aya Kamiki and B'z. In 2007, she made appearance as guest in Dimension's event "TAKASHI MASUZAKI presents “The Lounge Vol.10".

After releasing her best album "Shiori Takei Best" in 2008, she retired from singing.

Discography
Takei recorded 9 singles, 3 cover albums, 1 mini album, 3 studio albums and 1 best album.

Singles

Albums

Extended plays

Cover albums

Compilation albums

References

Anime musicians
Japanese women pop singers
Japanese lyricists
Japanese women singer-songwriters
Japanese singer-songwriters
21st-century Japanese singers
1985 births
Being Inc. artists
Living people
21st-century Japanese women singers